Eve Marder is a University Professor and the Victor and Gwendolyn Beinfield Professor of Neuroscience at Brandeis University. At Brandeis, Marder is also a member of the Volen National Center for Complex Systems. Dr. Marder is known for her pioneering work on small neuronal networks which her team has interrogated via a combination of complementary experimental and theoretical techniques.

Marder is particularly well known in the community for her work on neural circuits in the crustacean stomatogastric nervous system (STNS), a small network of 30 neurons. She discovered that circuits are not “hard-wired” to produce a single output or behavior, but can be reconfigured by neuromodulators to produce many outputs and behaviors while still maintaining the integrity of the circuit. Her work has revolutionized the way scientists approach the studies of neural circuits with respect to the study of structural and functional behavior. The general principles that have resulted from her work are thought to be generally applicable to other neural networks, including those in humans.

Marder has received numerous awards for her pioneering work in the field including memberships in the National Academy of Sciences and the American Academy of Arts and Sciences. In 2013, she was named to the National Institute of Health working group for the BRAIN Initiative.

Career, research, and service
Marder was born in Manhattan and raised on the east coast. Although she loved biology from an early age, Marder has shared that she held very diverse academic interests prior to starting her undergraduate degree and in fact entered Brandeis University as an undergraduate in 1965 with a plan to study politics and become a lawyer. She would instead find herself re-captivated by the world of biology and switched majors to Biology after her freshman year. Marder has shared that a pivotal turning point in her scientific self-development was writing a paper on schizophrenia during an abnormal psychology class during her junior year. Her subsequent library studies on inhibition in neural signaling solidified her career goals to become a neuroscientist and launched her on what would become her lifelong academic path.

Marder received her B.A. from Brandeis University in 1969 and subsequently completed Ph.D. studies at University of California, San Diego. It was during her time as a graduate student at UCSD that Marder would be introduced to the specific neural network, the lobster stomatogastric-ganglion system, that would prove pivotal for the rest of her academic career. Marder's doctoral work on the role of acetylcholine in the lobster STG led to a single-author paper in Nature. She completed her postdoctoral training at the University of Oregon in Eugene and the École Normale Supérieure in Paris, France. Marder subsequently began her independent research career at Brandeis University in 1978 as a faculty member in the department in Biology.

Her work on the 30 neurons that compose the lobster stomatogastric ganglion (STG) produced many notable findings. She found that circuits can be modulated by many neuromodulators, which act on the level of populations of neurons, unlike some neurotransmitters, which can only affect specific target neurons. She pioneered work on plasticity and homeostasis, revealing more about how the brain can change dramatically during learning and development yet remain structurally stable. Her recent work examining network variability among healthy individuals shows that a variety of network parameters can produce the same behavioral outcome, challenging a long-standing goal in theoretical neuroscience to model 'ideal' neurons and neural circuits.

Along with Larry Abbott, she also developed the dynamic clamp method, which enables an experimenter to induce mathematically modeled conductances into living neurons to view the output of theoretical circuits.

She is currently an elected counselor for the National Academy of Science, a member of the American Academy of Arts and Sciences and the United States National Academy of Sciences, serves on the National Institutes of Health working group for the BRAIN Initiative, and is a former president of the Society for Neuroscience. She is also a Deputy Editor at eLife, and, due to her early interest in politics, she often writes about science, politics, and society. In 1990 at Brandeis, she established one of the first undergraduate neuroscience programs in the United States.

Select publications

Eve Marder has an extensive publication record in the areas of neuromodulation, computational neuroscience, the dynamics of small networks, and neuropeptides. A selection of works are listed below:

Notable awards
Honorary Doctorate from Princeton University (2022)
National Academy of Science Award in the Neurosciences (2019)
Honorary Doctorate from Tel Aviv University (2017)
Kavli Prize in Neuroscience (2016)
Gruber Neuroscience Prize (2013)
Member, Institute of Medicine (2013)
George A. Miller Prize, Cognitive Neuroscience Society (2012)
Karl Spenser Lashley Prize, American Philosophical Society (2012)
Honorary Doctor of Science, Bowdoin College (2010)
Fellow, Biophysical Society (2008)
Member, National Academy of Sciences (2007)
President, Society for Neuroscience (2007)
President-Elect, Society for Neuroscience (2006–2007)
Gerard Prize, Society for Neuroscience (2005)
Trustee of the Grass Foundation (2002–2005)
Women in Neuroscience Mika Salpeter Lifetime Achievement Award (2002–2003)
Fellow, American Academy of Arts and Sciences (2001–2001)
MERIT (Method to Extend Research in Time) Award, National Institutes of Health (1995–2000)
McKnight Endowment fund for Neuroscience Investigator Award (1994)
Jacob Javits Neuroscience Investigator Award, National Advisory Neurological and Communicative Disorders and Stroke Council (1987–1994)

References

External links

  Brandeis Marder page
Eve Marder iBioseminars: "Understanding Circuit Dynamics"

Living people
1948 births
Brandeis University faculty
Brandeis University alumni
University of California, San Diego alumni
American neuroscientists
American women neuroscientists
Members of the United States National Academy of Sciences
Kavli Prize laureates in Neuroscience
Members of the National Academy of Medicine